The Minister for Education is the education minister of Sweden and the head of the Ministry of Education and Research.

The current minister for education is Mats Persson of the Liberals.

History  
As a result of the ministry reform in 1840, the Ministry of Education and Ecclesiastical Affairs was instituted. The head of the ministry was the minister of education and ecclesiastical affairs, with the responsibility of culture, the Church of Sweden, research and education. In 1968, the Ministry of Education and Ecclesiastical Affairs changed its name to the Ministry of Education and Cultural Affairs, today called the Ministry of Education and Research. The head of the Ministry of Education and Research is the minister for education.

List of officeholders

Minister for Education (1968—present) 

Swedish Ministers for Education